Li Jiaxing (born 19 March 1990 in Wuhan, Hubei) is a Chinese swimmer, who competed for Team China at the 2008 Summer Olympics and 2012 Summer Olympics.

Major achievements
2007 National Champions Tournament - 3rd 200m IM;
2007 National Championships - 3rd 100m back;
2008 World Short-Course Championships - 4th 200m IM

See also
China at the 2012 Summer Olympics - Swimming

References

http://2008teamchina.olympic.cn/index.php/personview/personsen/5351

1990 births
Living people
Swimmers from Wuhan
Olympic swimmers of China
Swimmers at the 2008 Summer Olympics
Swimmers at the 2012 Summer Olympics
Chinese female backstroke swimmers
Chinese female medley swimmers
21st-century Chinese women